Bathley is a civil parish in the Newark and Sherwood district of Nottinghamshire, England.  The parish contains five listed buildings that are recorded in the National Heritage List for England.  All the listed buildings are designated at Grade II, the lowest of the three grades, which is applied to "buildings of national importance and special interest".  The parish contains the village of Bathley and the surrounding countryside, and the listed buildings consist of houses, farmhouses and a farm building.


Buildings

References

Citations

Sources

 

Lists of listed buildings in Nottinghamshire